Washington School District or variation, may refer to:

 School District of Washington, Washington, Missouri, US
 Washington School District (Pennsylvania), Washington County, Pennsylvania, US
 Washington School District (Arkansas), Hempstead County in the US
 Washington Elementary School District, Phoenix-Glendale, Arizona, US
 Lake Washington School District, King County, U.S. state of Washington, US
 Metropolitan School District of Washington Township, Indianapolis, Indiana, US
 Washington County School District (disambiguation)
 Washington Local School District (disambiguation)
 School districts in the U.S. state of Washington, see List of school districts in Washington
 District of Columbia Public Schools, the school district for Washington, D.C.

See also

 
 
 
 Washington District (disambiguation)
 Washington Elementary School (disambiguation)
 Washington School (disambiguation)
 Washington (disambiguation)